Imre Beták (21 December 1922 – 9 November 1997) was a Hungarian cross-country skier. He competed in the men's 18 kilometre event at the 1948 Winter Olympics.

References

External links
 

1922 births
1997 deaths
Hungarian male cross-country skiers
Olympic cross-country skiers of Hungary
Cross-country skiers at the 1948 Winter Olympics
Sportspeople from Somogy County